Residents Against SARP Pollution (RASP) was formed in June 1998 in response to two incidents of toxic gases escaping the SARP UK chemical plant in May 1998, in the town of Killamarsh on the border of South Yorkshire and Derbyshire, England. The campaign was formed by local residents and members of the Socialist Party (England and Wales). The campaign eventually succeeded in forcing the closure of most of the SARP plant.

Formation of RASP

After a public meeting called by the Socialist Party (England and Wales), Ken Coates MEP, who was invited to speak, called for further meetings, which gave rise to the campaign, and also set up an independent inquiry into the site.

The year-long campaign involved marches and rooftop protests. RASP protesters even travelled to SARP's headquarters in France to protest.

Victory

The campaigners eventually won the closure of six of the seven sections of the site in late 1999, with the local council looking at siting non-toxic recycling processes on the site.

Campaign Officers

Chair - Kevin Jones 
Secretary - Faye Moran 
Treasurer - Pat Whitehouse 
Vice Chair - Roger Barraclough 
Membership Secretary - Samantha Martin 
Press Officer - John Moran 
Campaigns Officer - Alistair Tice 
Legal Officer - Bev Smith 
Youth Organisers - Tracey Nettleship, Emma Horsford 
Publicity Officer - Trevor Cockerill 

Contacts for the Townships:- 

Beighton - Dave Milsom 
Wales/Kiveton - Mike Sampson 
Swallownest - Paul Marshall

References

External links
RASP website

Environmental organisations based in England
Environment of South Yorkshire
Environment of Derbyshire